Nicolas François de Neufchâteau (17 April 175010 January 1828) was a French statesman, poet, and agricultural scientist.

Biography

Early years
Born at Saffais, in Meurthe-et-Moselle, the son of a schoolteacher, he studied at the college of Neufchâteau in the Vosges, and at the age of fourteen published a volume of poetry which obtained the interest of Voltaire. When only sixteen, he was elected member of some of the main academies of France. In 1783 he was named procureur-général to the council of Saint Domingue.
He had previously been engaged on a translation of Ariosto, which he finished before his return to France five years afterwards, but it was destroyed during the shipwreck which occurred during his voyage home.

Revolution
During the French Revolution, Neufchâteau was elected deputy supplant to the National Assembly, charged with the organization of the département of the Vosges, and elected later to the Legislative Assembly, of which he first became secretary and then president.
In 1793 he was imprisoned on account of his supposed political sentiments, as they were deduced from his drama Paméla ou la vertu récompensée (Théâtre de la Nation, 1 August 1793), but was released the following year with the start of the Thermidorian Reaction.

Directory and Napoleon
In 1797, he became Minister of the Interior, distinguishing himself by his thorough administration. It is Neufchâteau who initiated the French system of inland navigation. He inaugurated the museum of the Louvre and was one of the promoters of the Exposition des produits de l'industrie française, the first universal exhibition of industrial products. He replaced Lazare Carnot as a member of the French Directory, a position he held between 9 September 1797, and 23 April 1798.

From 1804 to 1806 he was president of the Sénat conservateur, coinciding with the establishment of the First Empire – his office implied that he was the one to solicit Napoleon Bonaparte to assume the title of Emperor. In 1803, he was admitted to the Académie française, and in 1808 he received the dignity of count. Retiring from public life in 1814, after the Bourbon Restoration, he occupied himself chiefly with the study of agriculture until his death.

Works
Neufchâteau had multiple accomplishments, and interested himself in a great variety of subjects, but his fame rests mostly on what he did as a statesman for the encouragement and development of the industries of France. His late poetical productions are not judged to be as original as his youth oeuvre.
He was a noted grammarian and literary critic, as is witnessed by his editions of the Lettres provinciales and Pensées of Blaise Pascal (Paris, 1822 and 1826) and Alain-René Lesage's Gil Blas (Paris, 1820). He was also the author of a large number of works on agriculture.

Bibliography
 Poésies diverses (1765)
 Ode sur les parlements (1771)
 Nouveaux Contes moraux (1781)
 Les Vosges (1796)
 Fables et contes (1814)
 Les Tropes, ou les figures de mots (1817)

See also

 Les Neuf Sœurs

Notes

References
  In turn, it cites as references:
 Recueil des lettres, circulaires, discours et autres actes publics émanés du duc François pendant ses deux exercices du ministère de l'Intérieur (Paris, An. vii.-viii., 2 vols)
 H. Bonnelier, Mémoires sur François de Neufchâteau (Paris, 1829)
 J. Lamoureux, Notice historique et littéraire sur la vie et les écrits de François de Neufchâteau (Paris, 1843)
 E. Meaume, Étude historique et biographique sur les Lorrains révolutionnaires: Palissot, Grégoire, François de Neufchâteau (Nancy, 1882)
 A. F. de Sillery, Notice biographique sur M. le comte François de Neufchâteau (1828)
 Ch. Simian, François de Neufchâteau et les expositions (Paris, 1889)

External links
 
 

1750 births
1828 deaths
People from Meurthe-et-Moselle
Directeurs of the First French Republic
French biographers
18th-century French dramatists and playwrights
19th-century French dramatists and playwrights
French economists
French interior ministers
18th-century French lawyers
French literary critics
French poets
Members of the Académie Française
Counts of the First French Empire
French agronomists
Grand Officiers of the Légion d'honneur
Burials at Père Lachaise Cemetery
French male essayists
French male poets
19th-century French essayists
19th-century French male writers
18th-century French male writers
19th-century French translators
Male biographers